Sergiu Prodan (born 9 December 1963) is a film director and the Minister of Culture of the Republic of Moldova.

Note

1963 births
Living people
Politicians from Chișinău
Government ministers of Moldova